The year 1911 in radio involved some significant events.

Events
 21 October – The Junior Wireless Club Limited becomes the Radio Club of America at a meeting held in New York City.
 Wilhelm II, German Emperor, sends Telefunken engineers to West Sayville, New York to erect three 600-foot (180-m) radio towers.
 The first Australian long range (520 km) coastal radio station is established in Sydney.
 John Ambrose Fleming publishes An Elementary Manual of Radiotelegraphy and Radiotelephony in London.

Births
 30 January – Hugh Marlowe, American actor (d. 1982)
 21 June – Chester Wilmot, Australian war correspondent (d. 1954)

References

 
Radio by year